Elisha Reynolds Potter (November 5, 1764September 26, 1835) was a statesman in the Federalist Party from Kingston, Rhode Island, who served several times as the Speaker in the Rhode Island State Assembly.

Personal life
Elisha Reynolds Potter was born in Little Rest (now known as Kingston) in the Colony of Rhode Island and Providence Plantations, and he resided there all his life Elisha Reynolds House.  He began his career as a blacksmith's apprentice, but switched to the law in 1793. Potter was said to be a very large man; when he traveled by stagecoach, he had to purchase two seats.

Career
Potter ran against Peleg Arnold in a special election for the U.S. House of Representatives in 1796 caused by Benjamin Bourne's resignation, and Potter won the election.  He served as a United States Congressman from 1796 to 1797 and again from 1809 to 1815.

He was elected a member of the American Antiquarian Society in 1815.

Potter ran for governor of Rhode Island in 1818, but lost to Nehemiah R. Knight.

His son, also Elisha Reynolds Potter, was also a Congressman.

Elisha Reynolds Potter is buried in Colonel Thomas Potter Cemetery near Kingston, Rhode Island.

See also
 Tavern Hall Preservation Society

External links

References

1764 births
1835 deaths
People from South Kingstown, Rhode Island
Federalist Party members of the United States House of Representatives from Rhode Island
Members of the American Antiquarian Society